Narsanda is a small village in the Kheda district of Gujarat, India. The region belongs to a green belt of charotar region in Gujarat state of India.
Narsanda is a village which is near to Anand and Nadiad. People from different religions such as Hinduism, Islam and Christianity live peacefully in this village. It has many temples such as Shiva temple near the beautiful lake, Swaminarayan temple, temple of Krishna, Bhathiji Maharaj Temple, Santaram Maharaj Temple, Khodiyar Mata Temple etc. There is a mosque as well for Muslims and Church for Christians too. Most of the people in village are farmers but with globalization many of the natives have migrated to different parts of India as well as in USA, England, Australia, UK, Canada, Kenya etc. Right now there are about 200 families living abroad from this village. Village Population is Around 8500 till 2020.

External links

Villages in Kheda district